The Jindřich Chalupecký Award is a prize awarded annually to young visual artists. Candidates must be Czech citizens under the age of 35.

History

The prize was established in 1990 by Václav Havel, Jiří Kolář and Theodor Pištěk. Until 2000, it was awarded in cooperation with the National Gallery in Prague, but following a dispute between Milan Knížák and David Černý the administration was moved to Brno (Dům umění města Brna and Dům pánů z Kunštátu).

Background

The prize is awarded by an independent jury, and is managed by the civic association Jindřich Chalupecký Society. It is named after the art critic and art historian Jindřich Chalupecký.

The winner receives CZK 50,000 together with a further CZK 100,000 for an exhibition, project or catalogue, and a six-week scholarship in New York.

The awards are announced in the magazine Reflex, and an award based on the voting on the website of the magazine carries CZK 30,000 and an auction of works by the finalists.

Laureates
Source: Jindřich Chalupecký Society

See also 

List of European art awards

References

External links
Jindřich Chalupecký Society 
Jindřich Chalupecký Award in Reflex  
Jindřich Chalupecký Award in VVP AVU 

Visual arts awards
Czech awards
Awards established in 1990